Stephen C. Levinson FBA (born 6 December 1947) is a British social scientist, known for his studies of the relations between culture, language and cognition, and former scientific director of the Language and Cognition department at the Max Planck Institute for Psycholinguistics in Nijmegen, the Netherlands.

Levinson was educated at Bedales School and King's College, Cambridge, where he received a BA in Archaeology and Social Anthropology, and University of California, Berkeley where he received a PhD in Linguistic Anthropology. He has held posts at the University of Cambridge, Stanford University and the Australian National University, and is currently Professor of Comparative Linguistics at Radboud University. In December 2017, he retired as director of the Language and Cognition department at the Max Planck Institute for Psycholinguistics. Among other distinctions, he is winner of the 1992 Stirling Prize, Fellow-elect of the Stanford Center for Advanced Study in the Behavioral Sciences, member of the Academia Europaea, and 2009 Hale Professor of the Linguistic Society of America. In 2017 Levinson received an honorary doctorate award from Uppsala University. He is the current president of the International Pragmatics Association.

Career
Levinson's earliest work was with John Gumperz in interactional sociolinguistics, studying the interaction patterns in a multilingual community in India. He has written extensively on pragmatics, producing the first comprehensive textbook in the field (1983). He locates his work on pragmatics under what he has called the Gricean umbrella (2000:12ff.), a broad theory of communication that focuses on the role of conversational implicatures. His work with Penelope Brown on language structures related to formality and politeness across the world led to the publication of Politeness: Universals in Language Usage (1978/1987), a foundational work in Politeness theory.

From 1991 onward Levinson has led his own research lab, funded by the Max Planck Society and based at the Max Planck Institute for Psycholinguistics. Work in his Language and Cognition group (formerly Cognitive Anthropology research group) focuses on linguistic diversity and its importance to cognitive science. The group has played a pioneering role in developing the field of semantic typology and new models of language documentation. LSA 2009, L&C Field Manuals and Stimulus Materials In 2009, Levinson co-wrote (with Nicholas Evans) a hotly debated article contesting the existence of non-trivial linguistic universals and arguing that linguistic diversity is a crucial datum for cognitive science. The department has also done work connecting typology with Conversation Analysis through studies on e.g. repair and sequence organization across a wide variety of language. This has also led to lesser studied languages being taken into account in Interactional linguistics. 

Levinson was one of the driving forces behind a re-evaluation of the notion of linguistic relativity in the early nineties, publishing (with Gumperz) an influential review of the issue (Current Anthropology, 1991) and co-editing (with Gumperz) a volume on the topic with contributions of experts from various fields (Gumperz & Levinson 1996). An influential paper with Penelope Brown titled Immanuel Kant among the Tenejapans: Anthropology as Empirical Philosophy won the 1992 Stirling Award of the Society for Psychological Anthropology. Levinson's work on language and space (Levinson & Brown 1993, Levinson 2003, 2006) demonstrated a form of linguistic relativity by showing that speakers of languages which use different spatial systems solve non-verbal spatial tasks in distinct ways. His recent work describes the relations between culture of the inhabitants of Rossel Island, and their Yélî Dnye language.

References cited and notable publications

References

External links
 Levinson's MPI homepage
 List of publications

1947 births
Living people
People educated at Bedales School
Alumni of King's College, Cambridge
University of California, Berkeley alumni
British social scientists
Fellows of the British Academy
Linguists of Papuan languages
Linguists of East Papuan languages
Fellows of the Cognitive Science Society
Max Planck Institute directors